Jordan Cane (born 23 May 2001) is a British former racing driver from West Sussex, England. Making his racing debut in the United States in 2015, Jordan was the youngest active Formula Car racer and was the youngest to score a point in the F1600 Championship Series. Jordan retired from racing in July 2018,  citing budgetary concerns.

Career

Jordan Cane attended the Goodwood Festival of Speed where he became interested in motorsports and asked his father to help him make his way into the industry. From 2012 to 2014 Jordan was competitively karting. In Jordan’s first karting experience, at Thruxton Circuit, he broke the track record after just four sessions.  In those two years, Jordan received awards such as Best Novice and entered into the British Super One Championship, where he placed 10th. Around that same time, he found himself traveling to America to try his hand at racing cars which led to attending the Skip Barber Racing School where he completed a 3-Day Racing School and an Advanced Racing School at Lime Rock Park.

For the 2015 season, Jordan joined Team Pelfrey for the F1600 Championship Series.  His first win as the youngest British driver in open-wheel racing took place at Mid-Ohio Sports Car Course on 5 July 2015. Continuing with the momentum Cane had from Mid-Ohio Sports Car Course, he won two more races and placed third in the first of three at Pittsburgh International Race Complex. The next round took F1600 Championship Series to New Jersey Motorsports Park where Jordan took home another victory and two more podiums, ending the weekend with his fourth win of the season and two-second-place finishes. He then went on to sweeping the final weekend back at Pittsburgh International Race Complex, taking all three wins which placed him 4th overall in the championship, despite missing the first six races due to age restrictions.

Racing record

Career summary

F1600 Championship Series

U.S. F2000 National Championship

References

External links
 

2001 births
Living people
English racing drivers
Sportspeople from West Sussex
BRDC British Formula 3 Championship drivers
U.S. F2000 National Championship drivers
Team Pelfrey drivers
Wayne Taylor Racing drivers